Ángel Aldeguer Guirado (born 9 December 1984), known as Ángel Guirado, is a professional footballer who plays as a forward for Spanish club Alhaurín de la Torre and the Philippines national team.

His professional career in Spain consisted of ten Segunda División matches for Córdoba and Vecindario. He went on to appear for teams in the Philippines, India, Thailand, Iceland, Gibraltar, Italy and Malaysia.

Club career
Born in Málaga, Andalusia, Guirado was an unsuccessful youth graduate at hometown club Málaga CF, going to play for two other clubs before completing his development. He started his senior career in 2003 with CE Mataró (preseason games only), moving to Catalonia neighbours CE Manresa in Tercera División shortly after and returning to his native region after the year was over, signing for Córdoba CF in Segunda División. During his spell in that tier he appeared in only nine games (out of 42) as the 2004–05 season ended in relegation, and represented mainly the B side in both the fourth division and the regional leagues.

Following a brief loan spell with Atlético Madrid B in Segunda División B, Guirado joined Deportivo de La Coruña for €50.000, but only appeared officially for the reserves, also being loaned twice during the 2006–07 campaign, playing a combined 17 matches for UD Vecindario (second level) and CD Lugo (third). He spent the following three seasons in division three with as many teams, being relegated twice.

Guirado signed for fourth-tier club CD Ronda in early October 2010. However, in the summer of 2011, he decided not to renew his contract in order to explore other possibilities, with scouts from China, Indonesia, Japan and the United Arab Emirates following his progress.

On 13 August 2011, Guirado agreed to a deal with Global Cebu F.C. in the Philippines. He was sent off in his first match against Philippine Army FC, and scored his first goal on 30 January 2012 in a 5–1 win over Manila Nomads FC.

Guirado joined I-League side Salgaocar F.C. on 17 August 2012. His one-year contract was terminated before the end of the year, due to poor performances and prolonged national team duties. He made eight appearances and scored three goals during his tenure, between the league and the Federation Cup.

In January 2015, Guirado moved to Udon Thani F.C. in the Thai Regional League Division 2. Seven months later, he signed for Icelandic club Knattspyrnudeild UMFG.

In late January 2017, Guirado signed with Italian amateurs A.C. Palazzolo. In May of the following year, he joined Malaysia Super League side Negeri Sembilan FA.

International career
On 26 February 2011, it was reported that Guirado would join the Philippines national team due to his ancestry. He made his debut in the 1–1 draw against Myanmar on 21 March, in the 2012 AFC Challenge Cup qualification tournament.

On his third appearance, for the same competition, Guirado scored two goals in the second half of the 3–0 away win against Bangladesh. In November 2017, after a four-year absence, he was recalled to the national team and included in the squad for the 2017 CTFA International Tournament in Taiwan, netting once in the 3–1 victory over Laos.

International goals
 (Philippines score listed first, score column indicates score after each Guirado goal)

Personal life
Born to a Filipina mother who hailed from Ilagan, Isabela, Guirado started playing football when he was six years old. He was a cousin of Caloy Garcia, a Filipino basketball assistant coach (including with the Rain or Shine Elasto Painters in the Philippine Basketball Association), and was also a distant uncle of ABS-CBN star model and actress Coleen Garcia.

Guirado's older brother, Juan Luis, was also a footballer. A defender, he spent most of his career in amateur football, appearing in 104 games in the third division for six teams, and also represented the Philippines internationally.

Honours

Club
Global
UFL Division 1: 2012

International
Philippines
Philippine Peace Cup: 2013
AFC Challenge Cup third place: 2012

References

External links

Deportivo archives

1984 births
Living people
Spanish people of Filipino descent
Citizens of the Philippines through descent
Filipino people of Spanish descent
Visayan people
Footballers from Málaga
Spanish footballers
Filipino footballers
Association football wingers
Association football forwards
Segunda División players
Segunda División B players
Tercera División players
CE Mataró players
CE Manresa players
Córdoba CF B players
Córdoba CF players
Atlético Madrid B players
Deportivo Fabril players
UD Vecindario players
CD Lugo players
Atlético Levante UD players
CD El Palo players
CD Olímpic de Xàtiva footballers
Global Makati F.C. players
I-League players
Salgaocar FC players
Angel Guirado
Angel Guirado
Angel Guirado
Ángel Guirado
Gibraltar Premier Division players
Lincoln Red Imps F.C. players
St Joseph's F.C. players
Malaysia Super League players
Negeri Sembilan FA players
Philippines international footballers
Spanish expatriate footballers
Filipino expatriate footballers
Expatriate footballers in India
Expatriate footballers in Thailand
Expatriate footballers in Iceland
Expatriate footballers in Gibraltar
Expatriate footballers in Italy
Expatriate footballers in Malaysia
Spanish expatriate sportspeople in India
Spanish expatriate sportspeople in Thailand
Spanish expatriate sportspeople in Gibraltar
Spanish expatriate sportspeople in Italy
Filipino expatriate sportspeople in India
Filipino expatriate sportspeople in Thailand
Filipino expatriate sportspeople in Iceland
Filipino expatriate sportspeople in Italy
Gibraltar National League players